Drita is an Albanian female given name, which means "light". The name may refer to:

FC Drita, Football Club from Kosovo
Drita Como (1958–1981), Albanian poet
Drita D'Avanzo (born 1976), Albanian-American reality television participant
Drita Pelingu (1926–2013), Albanian actress

See also
Drita (disambiguation)

Albanian feminine given names